
Gmina Psary is a rural gmina (administrative district) in Będzin County, Silesian Voivodeship, in southern Poland.

Villages
Gmina Psary contains the villages and settlements of Brzękowice Górne, Brzękowice-Wał, Chrobakowe, Dąbie, Goląsza Dolna, Goląsza Górna, Góra Siewierska, Gródków, Malinowice, Preczów, Psary, Sarnów and Strzyżowice.

Neighbouring gminas
Gmina Psary is bordered by the towns of Będzin, Dąbrowa Górnicza and Wojkowice, and by the gminas of Bobrowniki and Mierzęcice.

References

Psary
Będzin County